MIT App Inventor is a web application integrated development environment originally provided by Google, and now maintained by the Massachusetts Institute of Technology (MIT). It allows newcomers to computer programming to create application software (apps) for two operating systems (OS): Android and iOS, which, is in final beta testing. It is free and open-source software released under dual licensing: a Creative Commons Attribution ShareAlike 3.0 Unported license and an Apache License 2.0 for the source code.

It uses a graphical user interface (GUI) very similar to the programming languages Scratch (programming language) and StarLogo, which allows users to drag and drop visual objects to create an application that can be tested on Android and iOS devices and built to run as an Android app. It uses a companion mobile app that allows for instant live testing and debugging. In creating App Inventor, Google drew upon significant prior research in educational computing, and work done within Google on online development environments.

App Inventor and the other projects are based on and informed by constructionist learning theories, which emphasize that programming can be a vehicle for engaging powerful ideas through active learning. As such, it is part of an ongoing movement in computers and education that began with the work of Seymour Papert and the MIT Logo Group in the 1960s, and has also manifested itself with Mitchel Resnick's work on Lego Mindstorms and StarLogo.

App Inventor also supports the use of cloud data via its CloudDB component.

History

The application was made available through request on July 12, 2010, and released publicly on December 15, 2010. 
The App Inventor team was led by Hal Abelson and Mark Friedman.
In the second half of 2011, Google released the source code, terminated its server, and provided funding to create The MIT Center for Mobile Learning, led by App Inventor creator Hal Abelson and fellow MIT professors Eric Klopfer and Mitchel Resnick. The MIT version was launched in March 2012.

On December 6, 2013 (the start of the Hour of Code), MIT released App Inventor 2, renaming the original version "App Inventor Classic"  Major differences are:
 The blocks editor in the original version ran in a separate Java process, using the Open Blocks Java library for creating visual blocks programming languages and programming
 Open Blocks is distributed by MIT's Scheller Teacher Education Program (STEP) and is derived from master's thesis research by Ricarose Roque. Professor Eric Klopfer and Daniel Wendel of the Scheller Program supported the distribution of Open Blocks under an MIT License. Open Blocks visual programming is closely related to StarLogo TNG, a project of STEP, and Scratch, a project of the MIT Media Lab's Lifelong Kindergarten Group led by Mitchel Resnick. App Inventor 2 replaced Open Blocks with Blockly, a blocks editor that runs within a web browser.
The MIT AI2 Companion app enables real-time debugging on connected devices via Wi-Fi, or Universal Serial Bus (USB). In addition to this the user may use an "on computer" emulator available for Windows, MacOS, and Linux.

Spin-offs 
In June 2018, a baked version of App Inventor 2 called Kodular was launched. It is promoted as an 'improved' and more modern version of App Inventor 2.

See also
 Android software development
 Logo (programming language)
 Lego Mindstorms
 Windows Phone App Studio

References

External links
 

2010 software
App Inventor
Integrated development environments
Massachusetts Institute of Technology software
Mobile software programming tools
Visual programming languages
Programming languages created in 2010